Monti della Laga is a mountain range in the central Apennines of Italy. Their ruggedness and inaccessibility makes them one of the lesser known areas of the Italian peninsula.

Geography
In doing so they border the Italian Provinces of Teramo, L'Aquila, Ascoli Piceno and Rieti.

Monti della Laga is cut off from the Gran Sasso d'Italia mountain chain by the narrow Vomano Valley which itself leads to Passo delle Capannelle and the Lago di Campotosto (Lake of Campotosto). Within the Vomano Valley is the State Road SS 80. Also present are traces of a branch of the ancient Via Cecilia.

Land formations

The landscapes differ on the various sides of Monti della Laga. The Marche area is noted its harshness, Lazio for its profound steep banked gorges, and Abruzzo for its smooth undulating hills and valleys. The crest line begins at Monte Comunitore and leads up to the peak of Macera della Morte (standing at 2,073 metres where the three Italian regions intersect). It then rises once again to a height of 2,458 metres at Monte Gorzano, the highest peak in this chain and the highest peak in the Lazio region. Nearby mountain peaks of note include Cima Lepri (2,445 metres), Pizzo di Sevo (2,419 metres), Pizzo di Moscio (2,411 metres) and, standing at the southernmost point of the Monti della Laga mountain chain, Monte di Mezzo (2,155 metres).

Geology
The landmass of Monti della Laga has a more rounded off characteristic in comparison with many of the other Apennine areas. This phenomenon is because the soil is far more arenaceous (sandy) and has marble formations that are not found in other parts of the central Apennine Mountains farther to north and the south. Hence the geological name given to the area, "Formazione di Laga". More characteristic of the Apennine mountains are soils, rocks, and land formations made up of coal and dolomitic limestone.

Waterways
The soil of this area tends to be rather impermeable, which leads to a good many streams and small lakes. The irregularity of the land results in several magnificent waterfalls. Among the most beautiful and best known are those of Morricana al Ceppo, Volpara a Umito, Le Barche, Le Scalette, and L'Ortanza near Amatrice. In the cold winter months they sometimes freeze over, thereby offering ice climbing opportunities.

Villages and hamlets
The area is not densely inhabited but is dotted with numerous small, and at times rather remote, villages.

Fauna
Living in this mountainous zone are numerous species of wild animals including the Apennine wolf, deer, badgers, and the extremely rare Marsican brown bear. Among insects the butterfly Erebia pandrose has in these mountains its sole Apennine population.

Flora
The area is known for its vast and lush forests of beech, white pine, oak, chestnut, maple, basswood, ash, elm, and holly trees. Several uncommon silver birch stands can be found. A variety of orchids abound, including one rare species that has no leaves.

Trails and hiking
Located in this area are several trails containing vado, that is, narrow suspension bridges. They serve to link the opposing sides of the narrow valley passes and are now most used for hiking excursions. In times past these structures were rather rare and functioned as important transportation routes connecting Rome and the surrounding region of Lazio with Abruzzo and the Adriatic Sea. One of the most famous is called the Tracciolino di Annibale, taking its name from the legend that Hannibal once traveled over this route on his way from Carthage to Rome.

Many of the high plains areas of Monti della Laga are grazed as sheep pastures. Traditionally, the herds travel to the area to spend the summer in these high, and relatively cooler, elevations, escaping the lowlands where little grass grows thanks to low rainfall. Throughout the area are the sheep droves used by shepherds for this transhumance, the migration of sheep and people in the fall and spring from Abruzzo to Apulia and back.

Attractions
 Amatrice
 Montagna dei Fiori

Feasts and celebrations
For the past century and a half, on a high pasture known as Piano Roseto (a location midway between the villages of Cortino, San Giorgio and Crognaleto), a livestock raising celebration, known as the Fiera della Pastorizia has taken place in early July.

See also
 Gran Sasso
 Apennine Mountains
 Valle Piola

References

Laga
Laga
Laga
Laga
Laga
Province of L'Aquila
Province of Ascoli Piceno
Province of Rieti
Province of Teramo